Walter Ibarra (born November 1, 1987) is a Mexican professional baseball infielder for the Leones de Yucatán of the Mexican Baseball League.

Career

New York Yankees
Ibarra signed with the New York Yankees as an international free agent in 2006. He played for the Mexico national baseball team in the 2013 World Baseball Classic. After batting .312 in 20 games for the Trenton Thunder of the Class AA Eastern League in 2013, the Yankees promoted him to the Scranton/Wilkes-Barre RailRiders of the Class AAA International League.

Los Angeles Dodgers
Ibarra signed a minor league deal with the Chicago Cubs on November 11, 2013 but was released and signed with the Los Angeles Dodgers, who assigned him to the AAA Albuquerque Isotopes. In 97 games for the Isotopes, he hit .269 with 5 homers and 32 RBI, while splitting time between second base and shortstop.

Arizona Diamondbacks
On November 4, 2014, Ibarra signed a minor league contract with the Arizona Diamondbacks. On April 7, 2015, Ibarra was loaned to the Sultanes de Monterrey of the Mexican League and was returned to the Diamondbacks on September 24. He elected free agency On November 6, 2015.

Sultanes de Monterrey
On April 1, 2016, Ibarra signed with the Sultanes de Monterrey of the Mexican Baseball League.

Leones de Yucatán
On December 21, 2017, Ibarra was traded to the Leones de Yucatán of the Mexican League alongside Luis Juárez in exchange for Francisco Lugo and Ricky Alvarez. Ibarra did not play in a game in 2020 due to the cancellation of the Mexican League season because of the COVID-19 pandemic.

References

External links

1987 births
Living people
Águilas de Mexicali players
Albuquerque Isotopes players
Baseball players from Sinaloa
Charleston RiverDogs players
Chattanooga Lookouts players
Gulf Coast Yankees players
Leones de Yucatán players
Mexican expatriate baseball players in the United States
Mexican League baseball second basemen
Mexican League baseball shortstops
Naranjeros de Hermosillo players
Scranton/Wilkes-Barre RailRiders players
Sportspeople from Los Mochis
Staten Island Yankees players
Sultanes de Monterrey players
Tampa Yankees players
Trenton Thunder players
Venados de Mazatlán players
2013 World Baseball Classic players